The 2016–17 Harvard Crimson men's basketball team represented Harvard University during the 2016–17 NCAA Division I men's basketball season. The Crimson, led by 10th-year head coach Tommy Amaker, played their home games at Lavietes Pavilion in Boston, Massachusetts and were members of the Ivy League. They finished the season 18–10, 10–4 in Ivy League play to finish in second place. They lost in the semifinals of the inaugural Ivy League tournament to Yale.

Previous season 
The Crimson finished the 2015–16 season 14–16, 6–8 in Ivy League play to finish in fourth place.

Offseason

Departures

2016 recruiting class

2017 recruiting class

Roster

Schedule and results

|-
!colspan=9 style=| Exhibition

|-
!colspan=9 style=| Regular season

|-
!colspan=9 style=| Ivy League Men's tournament

Source:

References

Harvard Crimson men's basketball seasons
Harvard
Harvard Crimson men's basketball
Harvard Crimson men's basketball
Harvard Crimson men's basketball
Harvard Crimson men's basketball